Denj Kola (also Romanized as Denj Kolā and Denj Kalā; also known as Denj Sar) is a village in Aliabad Rural District, in the Central District of Qaem Shahr County, Mazandaran Province, Iran. At the 2006 census, its population was 282, in 70 families.

References 

Populated places in Qaem Shahr County